Paolo Canedi (born 27 November 1965) is an Italian bobsledder. He competed at the 1992 Winter Olympics and the 1994 Winter Olympics.

References

1965 births
Living people
Italian male bobsledders
Olympic bobsledders of Italy
Bobsledders at the 1992 Winter Olympics
Bobsledders at the 1994 Winter Olympics
Sportspeople from Milan